The Frontier is a 2014 American drama film directed by Matt Rabinowitz and written by Rabinowitz and Carlos Colunga. The film stars Max Gail, along with Coleman Kelly and Anastassia Sendyk.

The film premiered at SXSW on March 7, 2014. The film was released on May 5, 2015, by Virgil Films & Entertainment.

Plot
An estranged son travels back home to confront his overbearing father to see if there is any relationship left between them.

Sean, a retired literature professor and civic activist, writes a letter to his estranged son, Tennessee, a ranch hand. Tennessee is uncertain how to respond, but knowing he should see his aging father, he decides to go home. Tennessee arrives just as Nina, Sean's personal trainer fresh off a bad breakup, accepts Sean's offer to move in and help him write his memoirs. The tension between father and son is ever-present. As Sean and Nina work, Tennessee avoids his overbearing father with fix-up projects around the house. One evening after Nina has gone out, Sean and Tennessee find themselves alone in the house for the first time.

Cast
 Max Gail as Sean
 Coleman Kelly as Tennessee
 Anastassia Sendyk as Nina
 Katherine Cortez as Susan
 Oliver Seitz as Peter

Release
The Theatrical Release was in New York City on September 12, 2014.  The following week on September 19, 2014 the film opened in Los Angeles.

Reception
Critical reception for The Frontier has been mixed and the film holds a rating of 40 on Metacritic based on 4 reviews, indicating mixed or average reviews. 
The Hollywood Reporter and the Village Voice both panned the film overall, with the Village Voice commenting that the arguing between Gail and Kelly's characters made things a bit too tense, stating that "Things improve considerably once both they and the film as a whole mellow out, as Rabinowitz handles reconciliation better than conflict, but the reprieve is short-lived."

Accolades

The film won the following awards:

 2014 Best Feature Film award at the 1st annual Silver Springs International Film Festival.
 2014 Best Drama award at the 34th annual Breckenridge Film Festival
 2014 Best Actor in a Feature (Max Gail) at the 4th annual Massachusetts Independent Film Festival
 2014 Best Actress award (Anastassia Sendyk) at the 5th annual NYC Independent Film Festival
 2014 Best New Hampshire Feature award at the 14th annual New Hampshire Film Festival

References

External links
 
 
 
 

2014 drama films
2014 films
Films shot in Los Angeles
American drama films
2010s English-language films
2010s American films